Mount Achilles is a mountain that is part of the Du Cane Range, located in the Cradle Mountain-Lake St Clair National Park in Tasmania, Australia.

Mount Achilles consists of two main summits, the highest is known as 'Achilles Heel', and the other is referred to as 'Perrins Bluff'.
It is located in the more northern part of the park, and almost due east of Zeehan It is a major feature of the national park, and is a popular venue with bushwalkers and mountain climbers.

See also

 List of mountains in Tasmania

References

External links
 Parks Tasmania

Achilles
Central Highlands (Tasmania)